August Kukk (24 April 1908 – 5 April 1988) was an Estonian wrestler. He competed in the men's freestyle welterweight at the 1936 Summer Olympics.

References

External links
 

1908 births
1988 deaths
Estonian male sport wrestlers
Olympic wrestlers of Estonia
Wrestlers at the 1936 Summer Olympics
People from Lääneranna Parish
20th-century Estonian people